Leon Schulman Gaspard (2 March 1882 - 21 February 1964) was a Russian Empire-born painter, known for his paintings of indigenous cultures and folk traditions. He tended to paint scenes with throngs of people, and his favorite locations were in small towns in Russia, Asia, and the Taos Valley. He spent his youth in Russia and later studied in Paris, where he became a well-respected painter. He moved with his wife, American ballerina Evelyn Adell, to the United States. They eventually settled in Taos, New Mexico, though he continued to devote much of his time to traveling to paint in remote locations.

Early life and education
As a child, Gaspard traveled frequently with his father, who traded furs and fine rugs, throughout the Siberian Steppes. During these journeys, Gaspard began to sketch the wild, primitive world of the natives they met. His mother, Zyra, was an accomplished pianist, and Gaspard's parents hoped he would take up music. Nonetheless, they encouraged his artistic interests.

Gaspard pursued art studies in his hometown, Vitebsk. He worked with Yehuda Pen, a well-known Jewish-Belarusian artist. Gaspard and Marc Chagall became friendly rivals over a girl named Bella Rosenfeld, who later became Chagall's wife. Gaspard pursued further studies in Odessa, and then his family sent him to Paris. He enrolled at the Académie Julian, where he studied for almost eight years. He also worked independently with William-Adolphe Bouguereau. While he was in Paris, his parents died, which cut off his allowance, and abruptly ended his studies. However, Gaspard was able to sell a number of sketches to a dealer, and his career as an artist began.

Personal life
In 1908, Gaspard met Evelyn Adell, a wealthy American ballerina, who was living in Paris. She married him despite her parents' objections, and the couple embarked on an unusual honeymoon: a two-year horseback trip through Siberia.

Gaspard enlisted in the French Aviation Corps in 1914, and was seriously injured the following year. In a 1981 magazine article, in Artists of the Rockies and the Golden West, John Jellico writes that Gaspard leapt, without a parachute, from a falling plane. He landed in  a shell hole filled with water and mud, which miraculously saved his life. Gaspard loved to tell stories about his colorful travels, many of which Frank Waters included in the 1964 biography, Leon Gaspard. For this reason, it is sometimes difficult to distinguish fact from story in regards to Gaspard's life, as he often wove elaborate tales with both words and paintings.

Regardless of how Gaspard incurred the injury, historical evidence suggests that he was wounded in the war, and it inspired his move to New York. Later, he and his wife moved to Taos so he could recover in a warmer climate. Gaspard loved the wildness and cultural splendor in New Mexico, and he made Taos his permanent home from 1918 until his death in 1964. He continued to travel extensively to paint. In 1921 the Gaspard went to Japan, and journeyed throughout Asia. He left his wife in Peking, bought a pony, and traveled to inner Mongolia. He went through the Gobi desert, the mountains of Tien Shan, and the border of Tibet. The journey was two years and four months, and provided Gaspard with a lifetime of inspirational sketches.

Artistic career
Gaspard found artistic success in Taos, where Gaspard moved in 1918 and remained until his death. Unlike many of his contemporaries, Gaspard continued to paint Russia, and far off places, rather than focus on the local Native Americans and landscape. Though an anomaly, Gaspard's work was respected; in 1961, Gaspard had a one-man show in Taos. His work sold steadily in New York City, Detroit, Los Angeles and San Francisco, and he was well-known and financially successful.

Posthumous reputation
In 1965, the Museum of New Mexico's art museum held a retrospective exhibition of Gaspard in his memory.  In 1967, three years after Gaspard's death, the Maxwell Galleries held a retrospective exhibition of his work. His post-humous reputation began to take shape in 1982, with a retrospective exhibition by the Fenn Galleries in Santa Fe (now Nedra Matteucci Galleries). In November 2013, Nedra Matteucci Galleries held another major exhibition for the artist, Leon Gaspard: Impressions from Russia and the Faraway. The following galleries have also held major posthumous exhibitions: Hammer Galleries, New York (1968), Gerald Peters Gallery, Santa Fe (1984), and Berry-Hill Galleries, New York (1986). Gaspard's work has sold well at auction houses, and in the early 2000s, prices for his paintings increased dramatically. On November 29, 2007, the 1918 painting, The Finish of the Kermesse was sold at Christie's for $2,001,000.

References

External links 
 Site Leon Gaspard
 Arts and Antiques Leon Gaspard

1882 births
1964 deaths
Emigrants from the Russian Empire to France
French emigrants to the United States
Painters from the Russian Empire
Académie Julian alumni
Artists from Taos, New Mexico
20th-century American painters
American male painters
20th-century American male artists